María Antonia de Paz y Figueroa (1730 – 6 March 1799) was an Argentinian Roman Catholic nun who later established the Daughters of the Divine Savior. She later became known as "Mama Antula" and took as her religious name "María Antonia of Saint Joseph" upon becoming a professed religious.

She was – on the account of her model Christian life of heroic virtue – proclaimed to be Venerable in 2010. One miracle required for her beatification received the approval of Pope Francis on 3 March 2016; it allowed for her beatification in Santiago del Estero on 27 August 2016 in which Cardinal Angelo Amato presided over the celebration.

Life
María Antonia de Paz y Figueroa was born in 1730 in Argentina; she was descended from an illustrious family of rulers and conquerors. Her childhood was spent in the home where she led a devout life and decided at the age of fifteen that she wanted to devote herself entirely to God. It was at that time that there was no active cloistered religious life and therefore she decided to wear a black robe and live with other women in a small community.

Guided by the Jesuit priest Gaspar Juarez, she devoted her time to assisting parents in the instruction of their children and also catered to the sick and to the poor. She also spent time doing needlework. In 1767, Charles III of Spain expelled the Jesuits, promoting her to restore the Spiritual Exercises of Saint Ignatius. This was an initiative that was not well received due to the fact that there was a hostile environment to the Jesuits, yet she continued to organize this restoration. She began inviting people to retreats from 1768 until 1770, and she did this across Argentina to places such as Salavina and Atamasqui. After the success of the retreats in those places, she travelled to Buenos Aires and arrived there in September 1779 where she met with imperial officials, who refused her the task of restoration.

In 1780 the retreats in Buenos Aires began with incredible success and the Archbishop of Buenos Aires Sebastián Malvar y Pinto gave his support to her. Her work became well known not only in Argentina, but in France such as in the convent of Saint-Denis in Paris, where the prioress was the aunt of King Louis XVI. Letters she penned during this period were translated in languages such as English and German, and were sent for inspiration to various countries. She also established the Daughters of the Divine Savior.

On 6 March 1799 she died at the age of 69 and was buried in Buenos Aires.

Beatification
The beatification process opened in Buenos Aires in a diocesan process under Archbishop Mariano Antonio Espinosa on behalf of Pope Pius X on 23 October 1905 and it concluded its business on 29 September 1906. The formal introduction of the cause came under Pope Benedict XV on 8 August 1917 and it conferred upon her the title Servant of God.

The declaration of "nihil obstat" (nothing against) to the cause was granted on 26 January 1999 and allowed for a second diocesan process to open on 3 May 1999. That process concluded on 18 July 1999 and allowed for the formal decree of ratification to be granted on 3 December 1999 in order for the cause to proceed to the next stage, known as the "Roman Phase" due to the next investigation taking place in Rome.

The Positio was submitted to the Congregation for the Causes of Saints in Rome in 2005 for further evaluation. However, the cause was relegated to the historical commission due to the long-standing nature of the cause and the fact that it was regarding an individual with scarce documentation, and consultants met to approve the continuation of the cause on 17 January 2006.

Pope Benedict XVI recognized the fact that she had lived a model Christian life of heroic virtue and on 1 July 2010 proclaimed her to be Venerable.

A miracle in 1904 that was attributed to her intercession, and required for beatification, was investigated in Argentina and the process was formally ratified on 15 February 2002. The medical board in Rome met on 25 November 2010 to discuss the healing of the nun Rosa Vanina, yet the results were inconclusive and thus the board would meet again at a later date. As a result, the board met again on 25 June 2015 and approved the healing to be a miracle. Theologians met to discuss the cause on 10 November 2015 and gave it their positive approval. The case was taken to the members of the Congregation on 9 February 2016, who passed it to the pope for his approval. Pope Francis approved the healing as a miracle on 3 March 2016; this allowed for the beatification to take place in Santiago del Estero on 27 August 2016. Cardinal Angelo Amato presided over the celebration on the behalf of the pontiff.

The postulator of the cause made previous suggestions prior to the beatification that 2016 would be when she is beatified since it was solidified by the fact that Pope Francis strongly supported the cause's conclusion. After it was confirmed that the cause would receive papal approval an article on 10 February 2016 indicated that the actual beatification Mass would be celebrated either in September or October 2016.

References

External links
 Hagiography Circle
 Saints SQPN
 Mama Antula

1730 births
1799 deaths
18th-century venerated Christians
18th-century Argentine people
Argentine nuns
Argentine beatified people
Beatifications by Pope Francis
Founders of Catholic religious communities
People from Santiago del Estero Province
18th-century Roman Catholic nuns
Venerated Catholics by Pope Benedict XVI
18th-century Argentine women